The Utah Aviation Hall of Fame was established in 1996 to honor and recognize individuals in the State of Utah who have contributed significantly to Utah aviation. These people have distinguished themselves through major contributions in advancing aviation or heroic accomplishments as civil or military aviators in and for the State of Utah.

It is the greater goal of this program is to foster public appreciation for the contributions of these individuals to the education of air power. Specifically, the continuing education and development of civil or general, commercial, and military aviation throughout the State.

The official recognition of the Utah Aviation Hall of Fame was proclaimed by the Governor in 1996. It Governor proclaimed the 32nd Flight (Pioneer), Order of Daedalians, the National Fraternity of Military Pilots, as the sponsor and custodial agency for the program.  Honorees are inducted each year around Memorial Day.

The Utah Aviation Hall of Fame is located within the Hill Aerospace Museum, Hill AFB, UT (Interstate 15 Exit #338 / 5600 South Exit).  Hours of operation are the same as those of the museum: 9 a.m. - 4:30 p.m. Tuesday through Saturday (closed Sundays and Mondays), closed December 24–25 for the Christmas Holiday and closed January 1 for New Years Day.  Admission does not require entry onto Hill AFB and is free to the public.

Laurates of the Hall
In 1996, the original eleven inductees for the Hall of Fame were so honored when the Hall was established at the Hill Aerospace Museum. The current Administrator is Charles P. "Pat" Gilmore, Major, USAFR (Retired)

Current inductees
Major General Orvil A. Anderson, USAF  
Lieutenant Colonel Paul A. Bloomquist, AUS
General John Kenneth Cannon, USAF
Verenus "Vern" and Jessie Carter, Utah Aviation Pioneers
Brigadier General Darrell Stuart Cramer, USAF
Major General William E. Creer, USAF
Colonel Emmett Smith "Cyclone" Davis, USAF (2016)
Colonel Glenn Todd Eagleston, USAF
Captain Richard Taylor Eastmond, USN
Colonel Bernard F. Fisher, USAF
Jacob Edwin Garn, Utah Aeronautic Commission
Senator Jake Garn, BGEN Utah Air National Guard
Lieutenant Commander William Edward Hall, USNR
Colonel Gail Halvorsen, USAF
Robert H. Hinckley, Civil Aviation
Colonel Lorin Lavar Johnson, USAF
Lieutenant Colonel Clifford D. Jolley, USAF
Colonel Willard R. Macfarlane, USAF
Colonel Russell L. Maughan, USAF
Ardeth "Art" Mortensen, Civil Aviation
Alberta Hunt Nicholson, WASP
Lieutenant Colonel Chase J. Nielsen, USAF
Major General Chesley Gordon Peterson, USAF
Major Alden P. Rigby, USAF
Brigadier General Richard Condie Sanders, USAF
Colonel Walter T. Stewart, USAF
Harold A. Sweet, China National Aviation Corporation
Brigadier General Paul W. Tibbets, USAF
Lieutenant Wendell Van Twelves, USNR

See also
 North American aviation halls of fame
 Early Birds of Aviation
 Hall of fame
 Timeline of aviation
 Wright brothers
 Colorado Aviation Hall of Fame
 Aviation Hall of Fame and Museum of New Jersey
 Science Museum Oklahoma

Sources
 Utah Aviation Hall of Fame (Aerospace Heritage Foundation of Utah website)

External links
American Combat Airman Hall of Fame webpage (on CAF Airpower Museum website)
American Combat Airman Hall of Fame inductees webpage (on American Airpower Heritage Museum website)
 World War II Memories of Wendall Van Twelves. MSS 7606; 20th Century Western and Mormon Manuscripts; L. Tom Perry Special Collections, Harold B. Lee Library, Brigham Young University.

Aviation history of the United States
Aviation pioneers
Aviation halls of fame
Halls of fame in Utah
State halls of fame in the United States
Aerospace museums in Utah
History organizations based in the United States
Museums in Weber County, Utah
1996 establishments in Utah
Buildings and structures in Weber County, Utah
Awards established in 1996